Pyotr Sergeyevich Novikov (15 August 1901, Moscow, Russian Empire – 9 January 1975, Moscow, Soviet Union) was a Soviet mathematician.

Novikov is known for his work on combinatorial problems in group theory: the word problem for groups, and Burnside's problem. For proving the undecidability of the word problem in groups he was awarded the Lenin Prize in 1957.

In 1953 he became a corresponding member of the USSR Academy of Sciences and in 1960 he was elected a full member.

He was married to the mathematician Lyudmila Keldysh (1904–1976). The mathematician Sergei Novikov is his son. Sergei Adian and Albert Muchnik were among his students.

See also
Novikov–Boone theorem

References

External links 

 
 

1901 births
1975 deaths
Soviet mathematicians
20th-century Russian mathematicians
Moscow State University alumni
Soviet logicians
Group theorists
Full Members of the USSR Academy of Sciences
Academic staff of the D. Mendeleev University of Chemical Technology of Russia